Charotar University of Science and Technology (CHARUSAT) is established under the Gujarat Act No. 8 of 1995, Government of Gujarat. University Grants Commission (UGC) has empowered CHARUSAT to award Degrees under Section 22 of UGC Act 1956. Earlier campus was known as Education Campus Changa until 2009.The Gujarat Government has granted "Centre of Excellence" to the University. CHARUSAT was accredited with grade A+ by NAAC in 2022.

History
In 1994, Shri Charotar Moti Sattavis Patidar Kelavani Mandal was established from the parental organization (Matrusanstha) Shri Charotar Moti Sattavis Leuva Patidar Samaj, which has been working in the mission of social service through education for more than 125 years. The founder-president of the Kelavani mandal, the late Shri Chhotabhai Bhikhabhai Patel, and the late Dr. K.C. Patel (a renowned nuclear scientist and a prominent educationist of Gujarat), who succeeded him worked on the idea of a university at Education Campus, Changa (ECC). ECC started with the establishment of Charotar Institute of Technology - Changa (CITC) as the first institute which is now known as Chandubhai S. Patel Institute of Technology (CSPIT) in the year 2000.

With the need for autonomy, the ECC applied for university status at UGC and Gujarat Government, which was granted on July 7, 2009, when the ECC was accorded the status of University and Charotar University of Science and Technology was established.

Campus 
The university is situated in the village of Changa, a Charotar Moti Sattavis Patidar Samaj. Charotar is the region comprising the Anand and Kheda districts of Gujarat. The university has about 450 faculty members and 6500 students.

Faculties and constituent institutes

Faculty of Technology & Engineering

Chandubhai S. Patel Institute of Technology  
Chandubhai S. Patel Institute of Technology, formerly known as Charotar Institute of Technology - Changa, started with 240 seats with four bachelor's degree Engineering Programs in the year 2000. The institute now has a total intake of 720 seats in 6 programs of bachelor's degree and 180 seats of Post Graduate Degree. It  was ranked 2nd by GSIRF among engineering institute in Gujarat in their 2020 ranking.
Knowledge consortium of Gujarat has ranked Chandubhai S Patel Institute of Technology (CSPIT) - second in Gujarat  during Gujarat State Institution Ranking Framework (GSIRF) 2020.

Devang Patel Institute of Advance Technology & Research 
Devang Patel Institute of Advance Technology and Research-(DEPSTAR) is most recent institute, established under CHARUSAT and has total intake of 300 Seats.

The departments of CE & IT are also equipped with a high-tech VR (Virtual Reality) Lab.

Departments
 U and P.U. Patel Department of Computer Engineering
 Smt. K. D. Patel Department of Information Technology
 V.T.Patel Department of Electronics & Communication Engineering 
 M & V Patel Department of Electrical Engineering
 Department of Mechanical Engineering
 Department of Civil Engineering

Faculty of Computer Science & Applications

Smt. Chandaben Mohanbhai Patel Institute of Computer Applications 
Smt. Chandaben Mohanbhai Patel Institute of Computer Applications (CMPICA) offers a two-year full-time MCA Lateral programme, a two-year full-time Master of Science in Information Technology (M.Sc.(IT)) programme, a three-year full-time Bachelor of Computer Applications (BCA) programme, a three-year full-time Bachelor of Science in Information Technology (B.Sc.(IT)) programme and a Doctor of Philosophy (Ph.D.) programme.

Faculty of Pharmacy 
Ramanbhai Patel College of Pharmacy  
Ramanbhai Patel College of Pharmacy (RPCP was established with the patronage of Zydus Cadila Health Care Ltd. M.Pharm Programs at RPCP are executed under the auspices of T. P. Patel Centre for PG studies in Pharmacy. Knowledge consortium of Gujarat has ranked Ramanbhai Patel College of Pharmacy (RPCP) - fourth in GUJARAT during Gujarat State Institution Ranking Framework (GSIRF) 2020

Faculty of Management Studies

Indukaka Ipcowala Institute of Management 
Indukaka Ipcowala Institute of Management (I2IM) has been established under patronage from IPCO Industries – a business house and offers MBA Program approved by the All India Council for Technical Education (AICTE).

Departments
 Department of Humanities

Faculty of Applied Sciences

P D Patel Institute of Applied Sciences 
The P D Patel Institute of Applied Sciences (PDPIAS)  launched in the year 2007 has a repute to offer bachelor and masters courses in basic and applied sciences like Biosciences, Physical Sciences, Chemical Sciences and Mathematical Sciences. The institute also offers PhD program.
The Institute has been ranked 24th in nationally.

Departments
 Department of Physics 
 Department of Chemistry
 Department of Mathematics
 Department of Biological sciences

Faculty of Medical Sciences

Ashok and Rita Patel Institute of Physiotherapy 
Ashok & Rita Patel Institute of Physiotherapy offers evaluation system based on Cumulative Grade Point Average (CGPA) system and total credits to earn a Bachelor of Physiotherapy degree has 240 credits and Master of Physiotherapy degree has 100 credits.

Manikaka Topawala Institute of Nursing 
Manikaka Topawala Institute of Nursing (Formerly known as Charotar Institute of Nursing)  has student intake of 60 and also has program on General Nursing and Midwifery with the student intake of 40 and PG program with 5 specialties (Medical surgical nursing, Child health nursing, Mental Health nursing, Obstetrics and gynecology nursing and Community health nursing) with intake of 4 seats in each specialties. The institute also offers PhD program.

Knowledge consortium of Gujarat has ranked Manikaka Topawala Institute of Nursing (MTIN) - fifth in Gujarat  during Gujarat State Institution Ranking Framework (GSIRF) 2020.

Charotar Institute of Paramedical studies 
Charotar institute of paramedical sciences is established in 2016 with the aim of providing quality education in the field of paramedic. CIPS aims to create next-generation health care professionals through quality education, extensive clinical training, and community service.

Research centres
  CHARUSAT Space Research and Technology Centre (CSRTC)
  Dr. K. C. Patel Research and Development Centre (KRADLE)
  International Center for Cosmology

Rankings 

CHARUSAT has been ranked in the 151–200 band among universities in India by the National Institutional Ranking Framework (NIRF) in 2022.

References 

2009 establishments in Gujarat
Universities in Gujarat
Education in Anand district
Engineering colleges in Gujarat
Educational institutions established in 2009